Hebrew culture may refer to:
 Canaanite culture
 Jewish culture

See also
 Semitic culture